In geometry, the snub tetraoctagonal tiling is a uniform tiling of the hyperbolic plane. It has Schläfli symbol of sr{8,4}.

Images 
Drawn in chiral pairs, with edges missing between black triangles:

Related polyhedra and tiling 
The snub tetraoctagonal tiling  is seventh in a series of snub polyhedra and tilings with vertex figure 3.3.4.3.n.

References
 John H. Conway, Heidi Burgiel, Chaim Goodman-Strass, The Symmetries of Things 2008,  (Chapter 19, The Hyperbolic Archimedean Tessellations)

See also

Square tiling
Tilings of regular polygons
List of uniform planar tilings
List of regular polytopes

External links 

 Hyperbolic and Spherical Tiling Gallery
 KaleidoTile 3: Educational software to create spherical, planar and hyperbolic tilings
 Hyperbolic Planar Tessellations, Don Hatch

Chiral figures
Hyperbolic tilings
Isogonal tilings
Snub tilings
Uniform tilings